Allenbatrachus is a genus of toadfishes found in the Indian and western Pacific Oceans. The generic name honours the Humboldt State University ichthyologist George Allen (1923-2011), who introduced David Greenfield, who coined the name, to ichthyology.

Species
The recognized species in this genus are:
 Allenbatrachus grunniens (Linnaeus, 1758) (grunting toadfish)
 Allenbatrachus meridionalis D. W. Greenfield & W. L. Smith, 2004
 Allenbatrachus reticulatus (Steindachner, 1870)

References

Batrachoididae